Vincente Minnelli (born Lester Anthony Minnelli; February 28, 1903 – July 25, 1986) was an American stage director and film director. He directed the classic movie musicals Meet Me in St. Louis (1944), An American in Paris (1951), The Band Wagon (1953), and Gigi (1958). An American in Paris and Gigi both won the Academy Award for Best Picture, with Minnelli winning Best Director for Gigi. In addition to having directed some of the best known musicals of his day, Minnelli made many comedies and melodramas. He was married to Judy Garland from 1945 until 1951; the couple were the parents of Liza Minnelli.

Early life 
Lester Anthony Minnelli was born on February 28, 1903, to Marie Émilie Odile Lebeau and Vincent Charles Minnelli. He was baptized in Chicago, and was the youngest of four known sons, only two of whom survived to adulthood. His mother's stage name was Mina Gennell, and his father was the musical conductor of Minnelli Brothers' Tent Theater.

His mother was born in Chicago and was of French-Canadian descent with a probability of Anishinaabe lineage through her mother, who was born on Mackinac Island, Michigan. The family toured small towns primarily in Ohio, Indiana and Illinois, before settling in Delaware, Ohio.

His paternal grandfather, Vincenzo Minnelli, and great-uncle, Domenico Minnelli, both Sicilian revolutionaries, were forced to leave Sicily after the collapse of the provisional Sicilian government that arose from the 1848 revolution against Ferdinand II and Bourbon rule. Domenico Minnelli had been Vice-Chancellor of the Gran Corte Civile in Palermo at the time he helped organize the January 12, 1848, uprising there. After the Bourbon return to power Vincenzo reportedly hid in the catacombs of Palermo for 18 months before being successfully smuggled onto a New York-bound fruit steamer.

While traveling as a piano demonstrator for Knabe Pianos, Vincenzo met his future wife Nina Picket during a stop in Delaware, Ohio. Vincenzo was a music teacher and composer. Both the U.S. Library of Congress and the Newberry Library in Chicago have Vincenzo (aka Vincent) Minnelli compositions in their collections.

Career 
Following his high school graduation, Minnelli moved to Chicago, where he lived briefly with his maternal grandmother and an aunt. His first job was at Marshall Field's department store as a window dresser. He later worked as a photographer for Paul Stone, who specialized in photographing actors from Chicago's theater district. His interest in the theater grew and he was greatly interested in art and immersed himself in books on the subject. Minnelli's first job in the theater was at the Chicago Theatre where he worked as a costume and set designer. 

Owned by Balaban and Katz, the theater chain soon merged with a bigger national chain of Paramount-Publix and Minnelli sometimes found himself assigned to work on shows in New York City. He soon left Chicago and rented a tiny Greenwich Village apartment. He was eventually employed at Radio City Music Hall shortly after its 1932 opening as a set designer and worked his way up to stage director – he was also tasked to serve as a color consultant for the original interior design of the Rainbow Room.

After leaving Radio City Music Hall, the first play Minnelli directed was a musical revue for the Shuberts titled At Home Abroad which opened in October 1935 and starred Beatrice Lillie, Ethel Waters, and Eleanor Powell. The revue was well received and enjoyed a two-year run. Minnelli later worked on The Ziegfeld Follies of 1936, Hooray for What!, Very Warm for May, and The Show is On. Minnelli's reputation grew and he was offered a job at MGM in 1940 by producer Arthur Freed.

With his background in theatre, Minnelli was known as an auteur who always brought his stage experience to his films. The first film that he directed, Cabin in the Sky (1943), was visibly influenced by the theater. Shortly after that, he directed I Dood It (also 1943) with Red Skelton and Meet Me in St. Louis (1944), during which he fell in love with the film's star, Judy Garland. They had first met on the set of Strike Up the Band (1940), a Busby Berkeley film for which Minnelli was asked to design a musical sequence performed by Garland and Mickey Rooney. They began a courtship that eventually led to their marriage in June 1945. Their one child together, Liza Minnelli, grew up to become an Academy Award-winning actress and singer. The Minnelli family is thus unique in that father, mother and child all won Oscars.

Known as the director of musicals, including An American in Paris (1951), Brigadoon (1954), Kismet (1955), and Gigi (1958), he also directed comedies and melodramas, including Madame Bovary (1949), Father of the Bride (1950), The Bad and the Beautiful (1952), The Long, Long Trailer (1954), Lust for Life (1956), Designing Woman (1957), and The Courtship of Eddie's Father (1963). His last film was A Matter of Time (1976).

During the course of his career he directed seven different actors in Oscar-nominated performances: Spencer Tracy, Gloria Grahame, Kirk Douglas, Anthony Quinn, Arthur Kennedy, Shirley MacLaine and Martha Hyer. Grahame and Quinn won. Minnelli received an Oscar nomination as Best Director for An American in Paris (1951) and later won the Best Director Oscar for Gigi (1958). According to Peter Bart in his book The Gross, Minnelli's films having 11 first-place finishes on Variety's opening release box office rankings.

He was awarded France's highest civilian honor, Commandeur of the Legion of Honor, only weeks before his death in 1986.

Minnelli's critical reputation has known a certain amount of fluctuation, being admired (or dismissed) in America as a "pure stylist" who, in Andrew Sarris' words, "believes more in beauty than in art." Alan Jay Lerner (of Lerner and Loewe) described Minnelli as, "the greatest director of motion picture musicals the screen has ever seen."

His work reached a height of critical attention during the late 1950s and early 1960s in France with extensive studies in the Cahiers du Cinéma magazine, especially in the articles by Jean Douchet and Jean Domarchi, who saw in him "a cinematic visionary obsessed with beauty and harmony", and "an artist who could give substance to the world of dreams". Minnelli served as a juror at the 1967 Cannes Film Festival. The MGM compilation film That's Entertainment! showed clips from many of his films.

On February 8, 1960, Minnelli received a star on the Hollywood Walk of Fame for his contributions to the motion pictures industry at 6676 Hollywood Boulevard.

Personal life 
Minnelli was married to Judy Garland from June 15, 1945 to March 29, 1951. They had one child, Liza May Minnelli (born 1946) and the  marriage ended in divorce. 

He was married to Georgette Magnani from February 1, 1954 to  January 1, 1958. The couple also had one child, Christiane Nina Minnelli (born 1955) and the marriage ended in divorce. 

Minelli married Danica ("Denise") Radosavljević Gay Giulianelli de Gigante on January 15, 1962. They were divorced on August 1, 1971.

Minelli's last marriage, to Margaretta Lee Anderson, lasted from April 1, 1980 until Minnelli's death in 1986. She died in 2009 at the age of 100.

For years, there was speculation in the entertainment community that Minnelli was gay or bisexual. A biography by Emanuel Levy, Vincente Minnelli: Hollywood's Dark Dreamer, claims evidence that Minnelli did, in fact, live as an openly gay man in New York prior to his arrival in Hollywood, where the town that made him a film legend also pressured him back into the closet. According to Levy: "He was openly gay in New York – we were able to document names of companions and stories from Dorothy Parker. But when he came to Hollywood, I think he made the decision to repress that part of himself or to become bisexual." Lester Gaba, a retail display designer who knew Minnelli in New York, was reported to have frequently claimed having an affair with Minnelli, although the same person who related Gaba's claim also admitted that Gaba "was known to embellish quite a bit." Minnelli reportedly had an affair with Lena Horne while making Cabin in the Sky.

He had a pacemaker fitted on Christmas in 1982.

Death 
Minnelli died in his Beverly Hills home, on July 25, 1986, aged 83, of emphysema and pneumonia, which had caused him to be repeatedly hospitalized in his final year. He reportedly also suffered from Alzheimer's disease. He is interred in Forest Lawn Memorial Park in Glendale, California.

Minnelli left an estate valued at slightly over US$1.1 million, the bulk of which was left to his daughter, Liza. He bequeathed US$100,000 to his widow. While his home in Beverly Hills was left to his daughter Liza, Minnelli requested in his will that his widow continue to live there.

Filmography

Theatre credits

Published works

See also

References

Further reading 
 
 
 
 
 McElhaney, Joe.  The Death of Classical Cinema: Hitchcock, Lang, Minnelli. Albany: SUNY Press, 2006.
 McElhaney, Joe (ed).  Vincente Minnelli: The Art of Entertainment. Detroit: Wayne State University Press, 2009.

External links 

 Senses of Cinema: Great Directors Critical Database
 
 
 Vincente Minnelli papers, Margaret Herrick Library, Academy of Motion Picture Arts and Sciences

1903 births
1986 deaths
Best Directing Academy Award winners
Best Director Golden Globe winners
Directors of Palme d'Or winners
American people of French-Canadian descent
American people of Italian descent
Deaths from emphysema
Deaths from pneumonia in California
Deaths from Alzheimer's disease
Deaths from dementia in California
Burials at Forest Lawn Memorial Park (Glendale)
Artists from Chicago
People from Delaware, Ohio
Judy Garland
Commandeurs of the Légion d'honneur
Film directors from Ohio
Film directors from Illinois
Directors Guild of America Award winners
Window dressers
Catholics from Ohio